Lefter Millo (Greek: Λευτέρης Μίλος) (2 August 1966, Derviçan, Albania, – 8 March 1997, Giannouli, Greece) was an Albanian football midfielder, who was part of the Greek minority in Albania.

Club career
He made his senior debut for Luftëtari on 19 February 1984 against Skënderbeu and played for Partizani Tirana from 1986 to 1990. He was one in the first wave of Albanian footballers to leave the country for Greece following the fall of communism when he joined Larissa in 1991. He also played for Iraklis Thessaloniki.

International career
He made his debut for Albania in an August 1988 friendly match at home against Cuba and earned a total of 20 caps, scoring no goals. His final international was an October 1996 FIFA World Cup qualification match against Portugal.

International statistics
Source:

Personal life

Death
He was killed in a car accident in Giannouli, near Larissa in 1997, when he was only 30 years old. 13 Years later, a statue of him would be placed in his native village with an official ceremony.

Honours
Albanian Superliga: 1
 1987

References

External links
 

1966 births
1997 deaths
People from Dropull
Association football midfielders
Albanian footballers
Albania international footballers
Luftëtari Gjirokastër players
FK Partizani Tirana players
Athlitiki Enosi Larissa F.C. players
Iraklis Thessaloniki F.C. players
Albanian expatriate footballers
Expatriate footballers in Greece
Albanian expatriate sportspeople in Greece
Kategoria Superiore players
Road incident deaths in Greece